Pentakill is a virtual heavy metal band associated with the League of Legends universe. Their music is primarily composed and performed by Riot Games' in-house music team but features cameos by various renowned metal musicians. Their second album, Grasp of the Undying, reached Number 1 on the iTunes metal charts in 2017. Their third album III: Lost Chapter was premiered using an interactive "live" concert.

Members
Pentakill currently consists of seven members, all from the League of Legends universe: vocalists Kayle (Noora Louhimo) and Karthus (Jørn Lande), guitarist Mordekaiser, keyboardist Sona, bassist Yorick, and drummer Olaf. Other characters who appear include Viego.

Musicians involved

Discography
 Smite and Ignite (2014)
 II: Grasp of the Undying (2017)
 III: Lost Chapter (2021)

References

External links

League of Legends
Animated musical groups
Bands with fictional stage personas
Musical groups established in 2014
Heavy metal musical groups
Fictional characters invented for recorded music
Virtual influencers
Video game characters introduced in 2014